Joniny may refer to the following places in Poland:

Joniny, Lesser Poland Voivodeship
Joniny Małe, Pomeranian Voivodeship
Joniny Wielkie, Pomeranian Voivodeship